Francisco Marco (born 27 June 2003) is an Argentinian footballer who plays as a defender for Defensa y Justicia and the Argentina national under-20 football team.

Career
Marco made his league debut against Banfield, on 27 August 2022 in a 2-1 win for his side.

Personal life
The son of Lorena, Marco sometimes makes the L shape with his fingers on camera as a message to his mother.

International career
He was named in the Argentina under-20 squad by Javier Mascherano for the 2023 South American U-20 Championship held in Colombia in January and February 2023.

References

External links

2003 births
Living people
Argentine footballers
Association football defenders
Argentine Primera División players
Argentina youth international footballers